Christopher Cleland Schacht (born 6 December 1946) is a former Australian politician and member of the South Australian branch of the Australian Labor Party (ALP).  He was born in Melbourne and educated at the University of Adelaide and Wattle Park Teachers College.

Career 
Schacht's political career started as a state party official in 1969 during the Don Dunstan era. In 1987, he entered Federal Parliament as a Labor Party Senator for South Australia. He was Minister for Science and Small Business and Minister assisting the Prime Minister for Science in the Keating Labor Government from March 1993 to March 1994 and then Minister for Small Business, Customs and Construction until Labor's defeat at the 1996 election. He left the parliament in June 2002 after 15 years as a Senator and 33 years in Australian politics.

Post-parliamentary career
In 2006, Senator Robert Ray said of Schacht's "long-winded critiques" of factionalism within the Labor party that "no-one practised factionalism harder than he did. But once he lost influence in his own faction, he condemned all factions." Schacht has openly criticised the influence that he believes trade unions have within the Labor party.

Schacht has supported uranium mining and the prospect of nuclear waste storage in South Australia. He told ABC's Stateline in 2006 that storing the world's nuclear waste "may be the safest thing we can do for the world. Secondly, the world will pay a large amount of money in the future for some place like Australia or outback South Australia to store nuclear waste safely in a safe, in a geologically sound area, with a stable political system."

In 2008 Schacht was appointed as a Director of Marathon Resources. The company's exploration for uranium in Arkaroola later became a subject of controversy. A series of environmental breaches resulted in the revocation of the company's exploration license and the establishment of the Arkaroola Protection Zone.

As of 2015, Schacht is a registered political lobbyist in South Australia. His clients include Pilatus Australia, Liebherr Australia, PMB Defence and Basetec Services. Former clients include VIPAC Engineers and Scientists. Schacht is also the chairman of the Australia China Development Company and an ambassador for the National Secular Lobby.

Schacht is the President of the Australian Volleyball Federation. In October 2006, he was elected to the Legal Commission of the Fédération Internationale de Volleyball for a four-year term.

References 

Members of the Australian Senate
Members of the Australian Senate for South Australia
Australian Labor Party members of the Parliament of Australia
1946 births
Living people
Australian people of German descent
Australian lobbyists
21st-century Australian politicians
20th-century Australian politicians